Ecco is a New York-based publishing imprint of HarperCollins. It was founded in 1971 by Daniel Halpern as an independent publishing company; Publishers Weekly described it as "one of America's best-known literary houses." In 1999 Ecco was acquired by HarperCollins, with Halpern remaining at the head. Since 2000, Ecco has published the yearly anthology The Best American Science Writing, edited by Jesse Cohen. In 2011, Ecco created two separate publishing lines, one "curated" by chef-author Anthony Bourdain and the other by novelist Dennis Lehane.

History 
Halpern founded Ecco Press in 1971, originally to publish the literary magazine Antaeus (which folded in 1994). Ecco's name was suggested by Halpern's initial backer, ketchup heiress Drue Heinz. Initially, Ecco specialized in reissues and paperback editions of hardcovers previously published by other companies, including works by Paul Bowles, Cormac McCarthy, Charles Bukowski, and John Fante. It also published such noteworthy titles as Bells in Winter, a 1978 poetry collection by Czeslaw Milosz, who won the Nobel Prize in Literature in 1980, and Madhur Jaffrey's An Invitation to Indian Cooking. In 1991, Heinz transferred ownership to Halpern. Ecco Press remained independent, although affiliated with Viking Press and W.W. Norton & Company for sales and distribution, until its acquisition by HarperCollins in 1999.

Notable titles published by Ecco since 1999 include the paperback edition of Anthony Bourdain's Kitchen Confidential: Adventures in the Culinary Underbelly and Patti Smith's memoir, Just Kids. Currently, Ecco releases between 35 and 40 titles a year, usually a mixture of literary novels, biographies, memoirs, and culinary titles, by authors such as Joyce Carol Oates, Richard Ford, T.C. Boyle, Amy Tan, Margaret Atwood, Jonathan Lethem, Jelani Cobb, Simon Schama, Richard Dawkins, Russell Banks, Vendela Vida, Jorie Graham, Mario Batali, Daniel Boulud, and April Bloomfield.

In September 2011, Ecco announced that Anthony Bourdain would have his own publishing line, which would include acquiring three to five titles per year that "reflect his remarkably eclectic tastes." In describing the line, Bourdain said, "This will be a line of books for people with strong voices who are good at something — who speak with authority. Discern nothing from this initial list — other than a general affection for people who cook food and like food. The ability to kick people in the head is just as compelling to us — as long as that's coupled with an ability to vividly describe the experience. We are just as intent on crossing genres as we are enthusiastic about our first three authors. It only gets weirder from here."

In October 2011, Ecco announced that Dennis Lehane would have his own eponymous publishing line, acquiring ". . . literary fiction with a dark urban edge.” One of the initial books in the line was Ivy Pochoda's Visitation Street.

In 2020, it was announced that founding editor Daniel Halpern would move to an editor at large position; in 2021, fifty years after founding Ecco Press, Halpern joined Alfred A. Knopf as executive editor.

Selected Awards

Notes and references

External links

An interview with Ecco Press founding editor Daniel Halpern
An interview with Ecco Press editor Matt Weiland

Book publishing companies based in New York (state)
Publishing companies established in 1971
HarperCollins books
American companies established in 1971
1971 establishments in New York City